Eastern Bolivian Guaraní, known locally as Chawuncu or Chiriguano (pejorative), is a Guaraní language spoken in South America. In Bolivia 33,670 speakers, called the Ava Guarani people were counted in the year 2000, in the south-central Parapeti River area and in the city of Tarija. In Argentina, there were approximately 15,000 speakers, mostly in Jujuy, but also in Salta Province, and 304 counted in the Paraguayan Chaco.

Avá (Chané, Tapieté) and Izoceño are dialects.

In Argentina it is known as Western Argentine Guaraní, while in Paraguay it is locally known as Ñandeva. However, outside Paraguay and specifically in Brazil, Nhandeva refers to Chiripá Guaraní.

Eastern Bolivian Guaraní is one of a number of "Guaraní dialects" sometimes considered distinct languages. Of these, Paraguayan Guaraní is by far the most important variety and it is often referred to simply as Guaraní.

References

External links 

 Argentinian Languages Collection of Salvador Bucca at the Archive of the Indigenous Languages of Latin America, including audio recordings of 3 spoken stories and one word list in Eastern Bolivian Guaraní.

Languages of Argentina
Languages of Bolivia
Languages of Paraguay
Guarani languages
Tupian languages
Chaco linguistic area